Calicene or triapentafulvalene is a hydrocarbon of the fulvalene class with chemical formula C8H6, composed of a cyclopentadiene ring and a cyclopropene ring linked by a double bond. Its name is derived from the Latin calix meaning "goblet", from its shape.

Properties
Very high resonance energy is predicted by the Hückel method, however its resonance energy is not high.
The central double bond is polarized with a partial positive charge on the carbon atom of triangular ring and a partial negative charge on the carbon atom of pentagonal ring, in keeping with added Hückel's rule stability of rings containing 2 π electrons and 6 π electrons respectively. Calicene's dipole moment has been computed to be 4.66 D.
Several compounds that contains two or more calicene subunits are aromatic, such as trans-bicalicene (ring compound) or poly-2,7-[N]calicenes (chain compound)

Despite several attempts to prepare it, the parent calicene has so far defied attempts at synthesis.  However, 1,2,3,4,5,6-hexaphenylcalicene has been prepared and an experimental dipole moment of 6.3 D was measured.

References

Polycyclic nonaromatic hydrocarbons
Fulvalenes
Cyclopropenes
Hypothetical chemical compounds